Lobel's of New York is an online American butcher shop. Lobel's is known for its high-quality beef. The family business started with rancher Nathan Lobel in Austria in the 1840s. His grandson Morris, emigrated to the United States in 1911 at the age of seventeen. Morris opened a brick-and-mortar butcher shop in the Bronx and later at the current location on Manhattan's Upper East Side, Lobel's Prime Meats, at 1096 Madison Avenue. Leon, Nathan, and Stanley, followed their father, Morris, into the family business. Lobel's currently serves elite clientele and celebrities such as Harrison Ford. Lobel's products are not frozen and are shipped fresh overnight.

According to the Wall Street Journal, Lobel's has become synonymous with quality meat, particularly beef.

Fourth-generation butcher Leon Lobel died in 2006 passing ownership to his younger brother Stanley, his son Evan, and nephews, Mark and David Lobel. The sixth generation of family butchers entered the business in 2018: Mark's son, Brian Lobel, and Evan's daughter Joanna "Joey" Lobel.

In 2009, Lobel's teamed up with the New York Yankees to bring some of America's finest meats to Yankee Stadium. The most famed offering at the stadium is their hand-carved steak sandwiches.

See also
 List of food companies
 List of brand name food products

References

External links
 
Official Instagram

Food and drink companies established in 1840
Food and drink companies of the United States
Brand name meats
American companies established in 1840
Meat companies of the United States
1840 establishments in New York (state)
Companies based in Manhattan